Menesia is a genus of longhorn beetles of the subfamily Lamiinae, containing the following species:

subgenus Menesia
 Menesia akemiae Makihara, 1992
 Menesia albifrons Heyden, 1886
 Menesia bicoloricornis Breuning, 1963
 Menesia bimaculata Breuning, 1954
 Menesia bipunctata (Zoubkov, 1829)
 Menesia burmanensis Breuning, 1954
 Menesia calliope (Thomson, 1879)
 Menesia cana (Aurivillius, 1925)
 Menesia clytoides (Gahan, 1912)
 Menesia dallieri Pic, 1926
 Menesia discimaculata (Aurivillius, 1923)
 Menesia eclectica (Pascoe, 1867) 
 Menesia fasciolata (Aurivillius, 1922)
 Menesia flavoantennata Breuning, 1954
 Menesia flavotecta Heyden, 1886
 Menesia gleneoides Breuning, 1965
 Menesia guttata (Aurivillius, 1920)
 Menesia immaculipennis Breuning, 1954
 Menesia javanica Breuning, 1954
 Menesia kalshoveni Breuning, 1957
 Menesia laosensis Breuning, 1963
 Menesia latevittata Breuning, 1954
 Menesia longipes Breuning, 1954
 Menesia longitarsis Breuning, 1954
 Menesia makilingi (Heller, 1924)
 Menesia nigra (Aurivillius, 1922)
 Menesia nigriceps (Aurivillius, 1903)
 Menesia nigricornis (Aurivillius, 1913)
 Menesia niveoguttata (Aurivillius, 1925)
 Menesia ochreicollis Breuning, 1954
 Menesia octoguttata Breuning, 1954
 Menesia palliata (Pascoe, 1867)
 Menesia pulchella (Pascoe, 1867)
 Menesia sexvittata Breuning, 1962
 Menesia shelfordi (Aurivillius, 1923)
 Menesia subguttata Breuning, 1954
 Menesia sulphurata (Gebler, 1825)
 Menesia transversenotata (Heller, 1924)
 Menesia transversevittata Breuning, 1954
 Menesia vitiphaga Holzschuh, 2003
 Menesia vittata (Aurivillius, 1920)
 Menesia walshae Breuning, 1960

subgenus Tephrocoma
 Menesia livia (Pascoe, 1867)

References

 
Saperdini